Syunik is a village in the Kapan Municipality of the Syunik Province in Armenia.

Demographics 
The National Statistical Service of the Republic of Armenia (ARMSTAT) reported that the community's population was 1,294 in 2010, up from 1,023 at the 2001 census. The population of the village of Syunik was 791 at the 2011 census.

Municipal administration 
The village was the center of the Syunik community, which contained the villages of Syunik, Bargushat, Ditsmayri, Khordzor, and Sznak until the June 2017 administrative and territorial reforms, when the village became a part of the Kapan Municipality.

References 

Populated places in Syunik Province